Burim Nue Kukeli (born 16 January 1984) is an Albanian former professional footballer who played as a defensive midfielder. He is the current coach of Grasshopper Club Zürich U-21 squad.

A Zofingen product, Kukeli started his professional career in the 2004–05 season where he played 24 matches before earning a transfer to Schötz where he played in the next two seasons. In 2008, he joined Luzern where he made more than 100 top flight appearances. Between 2012 and 2017, he played more than 80 league matches for Zürich. However, his spell was marred by injuries. In 2017, he joined Sion, also in the top flight.

An Albanian international, Kukeli has more than 20 caps to his name since making his debut in 2012. He also was part of UEFA Euro 2016 squad.

Club career

Early career
Kukeli was born in Gjakova, Kosovo in the then Socialist Federal Republic of Yugoslavia, but moved to Switzerland at the age of four following his father road along with other part of his family. He started his youth career at age of 9 with the Solothurn youth academies.
Later he was in the squad of Wangen bei Olten and SC Zofingen.

Zofingen
With Zofingen he played 21 matches and scored 4 goals during the 2004–05 season of the Swiss 3rd league. He also managed to play a full 90-minutes match, valid for the Swiss Cup against Schaffhausen, finished in the 1–5 loss.

Schötz
Kukeli moved to FC Schötz during the 2005 summer transfers window. In the 2005–06 season of the 1. Liga Promotion (Swiss 3rd league) he played in total 11 matches, all as a starter and in only 1 substituted off, also he scored 4 goals while Schötz were relegated to the 1. Liga Classic, Swiss 4th league, for the next season.

Kukeli missed out the entire 2006–07 season of 1. Liga Classic due to a long injury. Schötz were promoted again in the 1. Liga Promotion.

During the 2007–08 season first half Kukeli made it 14 Appearances and scored 2 goals. He played 1 match in the Swiss cup against Mendrisio, which finished in the 3–1 loss, where Kukeli himself played a full 90-minutes match.

Luzern
In January 2008, Luzern completed the transfer of Kukeli. He made his first Swiss Super League debut at the age of 23 and finished second part of 2007–08 season with 10 appearances.

He suffered an injury which kept him out of play from the first half of the 2008–09 season. He played first match of the 2008–09 season only in the second half when he came in as a substitute in the 85th minute for Davide Chiumiento in the 2–3 loss against Young Boys on 15 February 2009. The second and last match of that season came on 30 May 2009 when he played as a starter in the 2–1 victory against Neuchâtel Xamax.

Zürich
On 15 April 2012, Kukeli completed a transfer to Zürich, rejoining his former Luzern boss Rolf Fringer. The transfer was set to be official on 1 July. Kukelli officially signed a contract until June 2015. He took squad number 20 and made his competitive debut on 15 July 2012 in the opening matchday of 2012–13 season against Luzern. He played 13 matches during the campaign, including one in cup.

On 3 February 2013, during the friendly against AC Bellinzona, Kukeli suffered a major injury after a challenge with Simon Grether, which resulted Kukeli injured with a tibia and fibula fracture in the leg. More than two weeks later, medical staff announced that Kukeli would be sidelined for the next nine months. He returned in training in January of the following year, and played his first match also that month as he appeared in a friendly versus MSV Duisburg which was an indicator for the player that he was not fully fit.

In April 2014, Kukeli undergo surgery again as the club had failed to treat his condition appropriately. On 11 June 2014, manager Urs Meier stated that Kukeli was ready to get back to action along with his teammate Alain Nef, who was also suffering from a long-time injury.

He made his first competitive appearance after 21 months on 20 July 2014 in the first day of 2014–15 Swiss Super League, assisting the lone goal of the match. Later on, in the 4–1 defeat at Basel, Kukeli had damaged legs' muscle and remained outside for 3 weeks. He returned on 31 August in the match against St. Gallen, and scored his maiden goal on 5 October in the 3–0 comfortable win over Vaduz.

Kukeli was sold to fellow top flight side Sion in July 2017. His last Zürich match on 30 July against Thun was also his 100th for the club in all competitions. During his 5-year spell, Kukeli managed to make 82 league appearances, in addition 7 cup appearances, and 11 Europa League appearances. He also scored two times, both in league.

Sion
On 9 August 2017, Sion and Zürich reached an agreement for the transfer of Kukeli for €200,000. He signed a contract until June 2019. There he found his Albania teammate Ermir Lenjani and ex assistant manager Paolo Tramezzani.

Kriens
SC Kriens announced on 18 June 2019, that Kukeli had joined the club on a 1-year contract.

International career
Kukeli received a call up by Albania manager Gianni de Biasi for the friendlies against Qatar and Iran in May 2012, but declined due to being tired and needed to rest following the end of the season. Later on 24 August 2012, Albanian government had started the procedures to give him an Albanian citizenship by the end of the month, so that he could be ready to represent Albania at 2014 FIFA World Cup qualification. He was declared eligible on 4 September after receiving the Albanian citizenship.

Kukeli made his competitive debut by playing entire match of the opening matchday against Cyprus as Albania begun Group E with a 3–1 home win. He continued to be regular at the lineup, starting in the next three matches but his injury while at Zürich meant that his campaign was over. Albania finished their group in 5th place with 11 points from 10 matches.

He returned to the national team in September 2014 for the UEFA Euro 2016 qualifiers. He put on a strong performance as Albania begun their qualifying campaign with a historical 1–0 win at Aveiro. Kukeli went on to play six further matches as Albania made history by qualifying for the UEFA Euro 2016, its first ever appearance at a major men's football tournament.

On 21 May 2016, Kukeli was named in Albania's preliminary 27-man squad for UEFA Euro 2016, and in Albania's final 23-man UEFA Euro 2016 squad on 31 May.

He made his first European Championship appearance on 11 June in the first Group A match against Switzerland. He also played in the second matchday against hosts of France as Albania's hopes for a spot in the next round were faded. After receiving yellow cards in both matches, Kukeli was suspended for the third one against Romania which was on 1–0. Albania finished the group in the third position with three points and with a goal difference –2, and was ranked last in the third-placed teams, which eventually eliminated them.

Coaching career

On 12 January 2022, he was announced as the new coach of Grasshopper Club Zürich's U21 squad, who play in the Swiss 1st League, the fourth tier of the Swiss football pyramid.

Style of play
Kukeli's natural position is defensive midfielder, but can also be deployed as centre-back.

Personal life
On 1 November 2016, Kukeli confirmed that he had become the father to twins.

Career statistics

Club

International

Honours
FC Luzern
 Swiss Super League runner-up: 2011–12
 Swiss Cup runner-up: 2011–12

FC Zürich
 Swiss Cup: 2013–14, 2015–16

References

External links
 
 FC Sion official profile
 
 Burim Kukeli – Euro 2016 profile at FSHF.org

1984 births
Living people
Sportspeople from Gjakova
Kosovo Albanians
Association football midfielders
Albanian footballers
Kosovan footballers
Albania international footballers
UEFA Euro 2016 players
FC Wangen bei Olten players
FC Solothurn players
FC Luzern players
FC Zürich players
FC Sion players
SC Kriens players
Swiss Super League players
Swiss Challenge League players
Albanian expatriate footballers
Albanian expatriate sportspeople in Switzerland
Kosovan expatriate sportspeople in Switzerland
Expatriate footballers in Switzerland